Hexapterella is a genus of flowering plants in the Burmanniaceae, first described as a genus in 1903. It is native to northern South America and to the Island of Trinidad.

Species 
 Hexapterella gentianoides Urb. - NW Brazil, the Guianas, Venezuela, Colombia, Trinidad
 Hexapterella steyermarkii  Maas & H.Maas - Cerro Aracamuni in S Venezuela

References

Burmanniaceae
Dioscoreales genera
Parasitic plants